"Surfer Girl" is a song by American rock band the Beach Boys from their 1963 album Surfer Girl. Written and sung by Brian Wilson, it was released as a single, backed with "Little Deuce Coupe", on July 22, 1963. The single was the first Beach Boys record to have Brian Wilson officially credited as the producer.

Background
Wilson frequently referred to "Surfer Girl" as his first original composition. However, his closest high school friends disputed this, recalling that Wilson had written numerous songs prior to "Surfer Girl". The lyrics were inspired by Judy Bowles, Wilson's first serious girlfriend, whom he had dated for three and a half years. He explained the genesis of the song: 

The song was based on a Dion and the Belmonts version of "When You Wish Upon a Star", which has the same AABA form.  As a solo artist, Wilson later covered it for the tribute album In the Key of Disney (2011), saying, "We're doin' "When You Wish Upon a Star" for the new album. It kinda inspired "Surfer Girl.".

Recording
The band first recorded the song at World Pacific Studios on February 8, 1962, at an early recording session. However, the recordings from that session, engineered by Hite Morgan, would not be released until 1969.

The song is written in the key of D major, with a key change to E-flat major after the B section.

Single release
The "Surfer Girl" single backed with "Little Deuce Coupe" was released on Capitol Records in the United States on July 22, 1963.  Cash Box described it as "a lilting soft beat-ballad charmer."

Charts

References

Bibliography
 
 
 

1963 singles
1963 songs
The Beach Boys songs
Capitol Records singles
Jan and Dean songs
Songs written by Brian Wilson
Song recordings produced by Brian Wilson